The North Mowich Glacier is a glacier located on the northwest flank of Mount Rainier in Washington. The southern arm of the glacier is connected to the adjacent Edmunds Glacier. This plateau is an unbroken expanse of ice except for Needle Rock, which pokes out of the glacier ice. The North Mowich Glacier gives rise to the North Mowich River.

See also
South Mowich Glacier
List of glaciers

References

Glaciers of Mount Rainier
Glaciers of Washington (state)